Javed Ahmed Tak is an Indian social worker. He has got Padma Shri in 2020 for his contribution in social work.

Early life and education
Tak is from Jammu and Kashmir. He did diploma in Human Rights and Computer Application from IGNOU. He has also done D.E.D.

Career
Javed established the Humanity Welfare Organization, which helps under privilege women by providing medical assistance. He has also founded an educational institution in Bijbehara named Zaiba Aapa Institute of Inclusive Education which provides free education to children with special need of the Union Territory of Jammu and Kashmir. In 2020, he got Padma Shri for his contribution in social work.

Awards
 Padma Shri (2020)

References

Living people
Recipients of the Padma Shri in social work
Indian social workers
Year of birth missing (living people)